Cyrtodactylus nyinyikyawi, also known commonly as the Shwe Settaw bent-toed gecko, is a species of lizard in the family Gekkonidae. The species is endemic to Myanmar.

Etymology
The specific name, nyinyikyawi, is in honor of Nyi Nyi Kyaw who is the Director General of the Forest Department of Myanmar.

Geographic range
C. nyinyikyawi is found in central Myanmar, in Magway Region.

Description

Reproduction
The mode of reproduction of C. nyinyikyawi is unknown.

References

Further reading
Grismer LL, Wood PL Jr, Thura MK, Win NM, Quah ESH (2019). "Two more new species of the Cyrtodactylus peguensis group (Squamata: Gekkonidae) from the fringes of the Ayeyarwady Basin, Myanmar". Zootaxa 4577 (2): 274–294. (Cyrtodactylus nyinyikyawi, new species).

Cyrtodactylus
Reptiles described in 2019
Reptiles of Myanmar
Endemic fauna of Myanmar